2017 China Open may refer to:

 2017 China Open (snooker)
 2017 China Open (tennis)